Podwierzbie may refer to the following places:
Podwierzbie, Lublin Voivodeship (east Poland)
Podwierzbie, Garwolin County in Masovian Voivodeship (east-central Poland)
Podwierzbie, Gmina Żelechów in Masovian Voivodeship (east-central Poland)
Podwierzbie, Sierpc County in Masovian Voivodeship (east-central Poland)